The 2005 United States Federal Budget began as a proposal by President George W. Bush to fund government operations for October 1, 2004 – September 30, 2005.
The requested budget was submitted to the 108th Congress on February 2, 2004.

President's proposal

National Security
• proposes increasing defense spending by 7%
• proposes increasing homeland security discretionary spending by 10%
• proposes $1.2 billion for rebuilding Afghanistan
• proposes over $5.7 billion in military and economic assistance to countries supporting the United States in the War on Terror
• proposes a 3.5% pay raise for military personnel
• proposes privatizing 90,000 military housing units by the end of 2005
• proposes a 20% increase for the Transportation Security Administration
• proposes a 9% increase for the Coast Guard
• proposes doubling the level of first responder preparedness grants targeted to high-threat areas
• proposes a 180% in funds for a new agriculture and food defense initiative 
• proposes $274 million for a new biosurveillance initiative
• proposes an 11% increase for the FBI, including a $357 million increase for counterterrorism activities

Economy
• proposes holding discretionary spending growth to below four percent, and non-security related spending to 0.5 percent, less than the rate of inflation
• proposes extending the tax cuts enacted in 2001 and 2003
• proposes new initiatives for tax-favored savings and retirement accounts for all Americans
• proposes a new $250 million grant program for community colleges
• proposes $333 million to help students make the transition from high school to college
• proposes more than $20 billion in small business lending and equity programs
• proposes a 10% increase in funding for the SEC

Education
• proposes increasing Title I funding by $1 billion, 52% more than in 2001
• proposes $1 billion more for Special Education, a 75% increase since 2001
• proposes a 12% increase for early reading programs
• proposes increasing Pell Grants by $856 million
• proposes to increase funding for Historically Black Colleges and Universities and minority-serving institutions by 30%
• proposes raising loan limits for first-year students, expanding options to offer courses on-line, and increasing loan forgiveness for those teaching certain subjects in high-poverty schools

Environment
• proposes $237 million to develop the world’s first "zero-emissions" coal-fueled power plant 
• proposes a 44% increase for hydrogen and fuel cell R&D
• proposes $58 million more for removing excess wood and brush that fuel fires (Healthy Forests Initiative)
• proposes $65 million for an expanded diesel school bus retrofit program to reduce harmful bus emissions
• proposes $45 million, nearly a 500% increase, for Great Lakes clean-up
• proposes increasing Superfund long-term cleanups by $124 million (nearly a 50-percent increase).

Health Care
• proposes allowing small businesses to purchase coverage for employees through Association Health Plans
• proposes a refundable tax credit for low-income Americans to access to health insurance
• proposes allowing individuals to deduct the premiums associated with HSAs
• proposes vouchers for substance abuse treatment services to an estimated 100,000 people
• proposes an additional $8.3 million, a near 40% increase, to enhance FDA enforcement of Federal regulations to prevent the introduction or spread of bovine spongiform encephalopathy

Faith-Based and Community Initiatives
• proposes a four-year $300 million Prisoner Re-Entry initiative
• proposes doubling the Access to Recovery program to $200 million
• proposes more than doubling resources for the Compassion Capital Fund, ($100 million)
• proposes $50 million for mentoring children of prisoners
• proposes over $1 billion for the Corporation for National and Community Service; includes $442 million to support 75,000 AmeriCorps members;
• proposes $225 million to expand the National Senior Service Corps to 600,000 volunteers
• proposes $1.9 billion in charitable tax incentives

Other Priorities
• proposes linking the paychecks of government employees to performance
• proposes examining 100% of the government’s program spending within three years
• proposes increases the VA medical care budget 41 percent above 2001 level
• proposes a $400 million increase and the 2nd installment of the five-year HIV/AIDS plan
• proposes $2.5 billion for the [Millennium Challenge Corporation | Millennium Challenge Account]
• proposes $3 billion over five years in Federal and State funds to promote marriage and healthy family development including abstinence by teens
• proposes doubling the funding for Abstinence Education grants
• proposes $52 million increase for child abuse prevention through the Child Abuse Prevention and Treatment Act (CAPTA) State Grants and the Community-Based Child Abuse Prevention (CBCAP) program.
• proposes $240 million annually in dollar-for-dollar State match program to develop innovative approaches to promoting healthy marriage and reducing out-of-wedlock births
• proposes $50 million to assist non-custodial fathers in becoming more involved in their children’s lives
• proposes an additional $23 million for schools that want to use drug testing to save children’s lives.
• proposes completing the International Space Station, retiring the shuttle by 2010, and focusing on a new space exploration vehicle capable of new space exploration missions to the Moon, Mars, and beyond.

Congressional action
On March 5, 2004, Senate Concurrent Resolution 95, sponsored by Senator Don Nickles, was introduced in the Senate. Debate occurred in the Senate from March 8 to 12 and the Senate adopted an amended resolution shortly after 1 a.m. Friday March 12, 2004 with a vote of 51 to 45 along strict party lines except for Zell Miller, Democrat of Georgia, voting Yea. The resolution was then sent to the House.

House Concurrent Resolution 393 was introduced in the House on March 19, 2004 sponsored by Representative Nussle. The resolution was agreed to in the House on March 25 by a vote of 215 - 212; all 215 Yea votes came from Republicans while all Democrats, the Independent Bernie Sanders, and 10 Republicans voted Nay. On March 29, the House amended Senate Resolution 95 to contain the text from House Resolution 393 and agreed to the resolution as amended.

The versions from each chamber being different, a conference committee was convened. The House appointed Representatives Nussle, Portman and Spratt; the Senate appointed Senators Nickles, Domenici, Grassley, Gregg, Conrad, Hollings, and Sarbanes. The committee filed its conference report (House Report 108-498) on May 19, and the House agreed to the conference report later that day by a vote of 216 - 213. The Senate never took up consideration of the report, therefore Congress ultimately did not finalize a budget resolution for fiscal year 2005. In lieu of a budget resolution, the House passed H.R. 649 which resolved that once the House adopts the conference report: "(1) the provisions of the conference report and its joint explanatory statement shall have force and effect in the House" and "(2) for purposes of title III of the Congressional Budget Act of 1974, the conference report shall be considered adopted by the Congress." The Senate laid out the budget allocations as part (Section 14007) of the Defense Appropriations Act, 2005.

Enacted Appropriations

Source

Total revenue and spending

Receipts

Receipts by source: (in billions of dollars)

Outlays

Outlays by budget function: (in millions)

Deficit/Surplus
The proposed budget contained an estimated deficit of $364 billion.
The actual deficit for the fiscal year was $318.3 billion (2.5% of GDP).

References

External links
 Status of Appropriations Legislation for Fiscal Year 2008

2005
2005 in American politics
United States federal budget